The Pain Killer Tour was the third headlining tour by American country music band Little Big Town. The tour was in support of their sixth studio album Painkiller (2014), and began on November 8, 2014, in Youngstown, Ohio. It concluded on November 21, 2015, in Spokane, Washington. Little Big Town consists of Karen Fairchild, Jimi Westbrook, Kimberly Schalpman and Philip Sweet.

Background
Little Big Town first announced the tour in August 2014. Band member Karen Fairchild says, "We are so excited to share Pain Killer and get on the road for this tour", "Kimberly, Phillip, Jimi and I are thrilled to have such amazing openers in Brett and Brothers...we're big fans." The second leg was announced on December 15, 2015.
The second leg of the tour was announced in December 2014. In May 2015, dates for the fall 2015 leg were announced.

Opening acts

1st leg
Brett Eldredge
Brothers Osborne

2nd leg
Chris Stapleton

Europe leg
The Shires
3rd leg 
Chris Stapleton
David Nail
Ashley Monroe

4th leg
The Band Perry
Cam 
The Big Fire
David Nail
The Shires
Drake White
Holly Williams

Setlist
{{hidden
| headercss = background: #d8342b; font-size: 100%; width: 59%;
| contentcss = text-align: left; font-size: 100%; width: 75%;
| header    = North America Leg 1
| content   = November 8-December 13, 2014
"Day Drinking"
"Quit Breaking Up With Me"
"Front Porch Thing"
"Bring It on Home"
"Tumble and Fall"
"Pain Killer"
"Girl Crush" 
"Faster Gun"
"Little White Church"
"Sober"
"I'm With the Band"
"Good People"
"Front Porch Thing"
"Liza Jane" (Vince Gill cover, performed with Brett Eldredge & Brothers Osborne)
"Your Side of the Bed"
"Stay All Night"
"Save Your Sin"
"Things You Don't Think About"
"The Chain" (Fleetwood Mac cover)
"Tornado"
"Pontoon"
Encore
"Turn the Lights On"
"Boondocks"

"Santa Claus Is Back in Town" (Elvis Presley cover, performed in Rockford, Illinois) 
Source:
}}
{{hidden
| headercss = background: #d8342b; font-size: 100%; width: 59%;
| contentcss = text-align: left; font-size: 100%; width: 75%;
| header = Europe
| content = Songs not performed in the same order every night
"Turn the Lights On"
"Day Drinking"
"Quit Breaking Up with Me"
"Front Porch Thing"
"On Fire Tonight"
"Bring It on Home"
"Tumble and Fall"
"Good People"
"I'm With the Band"
"Pain Killer"
"Girl Crush"
"Faster Gun"
"Leavin' In Your Eyes"
"Little White Church"
"Sober"
"Live Forever"
"Things You Don't Think About"
"The Chain" (Fleetwood Mac cover)
"Stay All Night"
"Save Your Sin"
"Tornado"
"Pontoon"
Encore
"Boondocks"
Source:
}}
{{hidden
| headercss = background: #d8342b; font-size: 100%; width: 59%;
| contentcss = text-align: left; font-size: 100%; width: 75%;
| header  = North America Leg 2
| content = March 5–28, 2015
"Day Drinking"
"Quit Breaking Up With Me"
"Front Porch Thing"
"Bring It on Home"
"Tumble and Fall"
"Pain Killer"
"Girl Crush" 
"Faster Gun"
"Little White Church"
"Sober"
"I'm With the Band"
"Good People"
"Night Owl"
"Jolene" (Dolly Parton cover)
"Save Your Sin"
"Stay All Night"
"The Chain" (Fleetwood Mac cover)
"Tornado"
"Pontoon"
Encore
"Turn the Lights Out"
"Boondocks"
"The Beginning"
Source:
}}

Tour dates

List of fairs
 This concert is a part of the Del Mar Fair.
 This concert is a part of the Great Allentown Fair.

Box office

References

2014 concert tours
2015 concert tours
Little Big Town concert tours